As the Bell Rings is the Taiwan adaptation of As the Bell Rings. It is adapted from the original series Quelli dell' Intervallo by Disney Channel Italy and As the Bell Rings.

Characters

Main Cast 
Ami Yang as Zhang Jie (張杰)
Fandy Fan as Ding Liang (丁亮)
Katie Chen as Hu Die (胡蝶)
J.C. as Yang Fan (羊帆)

Supporting Cast 
Hsiao Chih-wei as Li Qi (李奇)
Liu Guo-shao as Zhu Zihao (朱子豪)
Beatrice Fang as Di Di (狄笛)
An-chi as Wen Shanshan (文杉杉)
Orange as Dinosaur girl (恐龍妹)
Yang Zong-hua as Principal (校長)
Hsu Chun-keng as Teacher Ai (艾老師, season 2)
Zhang Ya-lan as Queen (女王, season 2)

Guest 
Wang Zi as Lo Mi-ou (Romeo, 羅米歐)
Evonne Hsu as Hsu Yi-fan (許伊凡)

See also
As the Bell Rings

External links
Season 1
Season 2

2012 Taiwanese television series debuts
2013 Taiwanese television series endings
Chinese children's animated television series
Taiwanese drama television series
Taiwanese romance television series
Disney Channels Worldwide original programming
2010s high school television series